Adrienna Jenkins (born July 22, 1984) is an American mixed martial artist who competes in the Women's Featherweight division of Bellator.
She now currently works as a MMA referee/ judge.

Mixed martial arts career 
Jenkins made her MMA debut in 2004, at WEC 9 - Cold Blooded against Keri Scarr. She won by disqualification after she was hit with an illegal upkick and knee.

Jenkins fought Alisa Cantwell at XFO 3 losing in the first round via submission due to punches. She quickly returned in a month after submitting Shelby Walker at HOOKnSHOOT - Evolution 2.

Jenkins went undefeated from November 6, 2004 to February 10, 2007 with a record of 10-1. Her streak ended when she took on Kelly Kobold.
Jenkins quickly rebounded off the loss by winning her next 7 fights with one of those wins coming over Bellator & Invicta FC Sarah Schneider in the first round of the FCF Women's Bantamweight Grand Prix.

Jenkins took on Jan Finney in the semi finals, losing via split decision. Jenkins then replaced Finney in the finals of the tournament after FCF released her so she could fight in Strikeforce. Adrienna was now taking on future UFC vet Shayna Baszler in the Grand Prix final. She lost via first round submission.

Jenkins lost her third straight fight when she took on Tonya Evinger at RW 8 - Cage Supremacy, which saw Jenkins leave the sport.

Jenkins made a return after five-year hiatus to take on Kelsey Jorgenson. She won via TKO in just 27 seconds.

Bellator
Jenkins made her Bellator debut at Bellator 137 taking on Arlene Blencowe. she lost via TKO.

Jenkins returned at Bellator 141 against Lissette Neri. she won via first-round TKO.

Mixed martial arts record

|-
|Win
|align=center| 19-6
| Lissette Neri
| TKO (Punches)
| Bellator 141
|August 28, 2015
|align=center|1
|align=center|2:38
|Temecula, California, United States
|
|-
|Loss
|align=center| 18-6
| Arlene Blencowe
| TKO (Punches)
| Bellator 137
|May 15, 2015
|align=center|1
|align=center|4:08
|Temecula, California, United States
|
|-
|Win
|align=center| 18-5
| Kelsey Jorgenson
| TKO (Punches)
| Gladiator Challenge - California State Championship Series
|April 11, 2015
|align=center|1
|align=center|0:27
|San Jacinto, California, United States
|
|-
|Loss
|align=center| 17-5
| Tonya Evinger
| TKO (Elbows and Punches)
| RW 8 - Cage Supremacy
|July 17, 2010
|align=center|2
|align=center|3:16
|Salamanca, New York, United States
|
|-
|Loss
|align=center| 17-4
| Shayna Baszler
| Submission (Armbar)
| Freestyle Cage Fighting 42
|June 2, 2010
|align=center|1
|align=center|2:12
|Shawnee, Oklahoma, United States
|| FCF Grand Prix Finals. (Jenkins replaced Finney she signed with Strikeforce.)
|-
|Loss
|align=center| 17-3
| Jan Finney
| Decision (Split)
| Freestyle Cage Fighting 40
|March 27, 2010
|align=center|3
|align=center|5:00
|Shawnee, Oklahoma, United States
| FCF Grand Prix Semi-finals.
|-
|Win
|align=center| 17-2
| Sarah Schneider
| Submission (Rear-Naked Choke)
| Freestyle Cage Fighting 39
|January 30, 2010
|align=center|2
|align=center|3:07
|Shawnee, Oklahoma, United States
| FCF Grand Prix Quarter-finals.
|-
|Win
|align=center| 16-2
| Krista Stufflebeem
| TKO (Punches)
| Extreme Challenge 137
|October 17, 2009
|align=center|1
|align=center|1:06
|Iowa, United States
|
|-
|Win
|align=center| 15-2
| Sarah Patterson
| Submission (Armbar)
| MFC 8 - Ultimate Outlaws
|August 14, 2009
|align=center|1
|align=center|1:36
|Iowa, United States
|
|-
|Win
|align=center| 14-2
| Sarah Oriza
| Submission (Rear-Naked Choke)
| The Cage Inc. - Battle at the Border 2
|June 12, 2009
|align=center|1
|align=center|1:03
|Hankinson, North Dakota, United States
|
|-
|Win
|align=center| 13-2
| Jessica Nickerson
| Submission (Punches)
| Extreme Challenge 127
|April 25, 2009
|align=center|1
|align=center|0:51
|Iowa, United States
|
|-
|Win
|align=center| 12-2
| Constance Griffiths
| TKO (Punches)
| MFC 3 - Outdoor War
|August 16, 2008
|align=center|1
|align=center|1:53
|Centerville, Iowa, United States
|
|-
|Win
|align=center| 11-2
| Akulina Kvokov
| TKO (Punches)
| MCF 3 - Contagious
|May 5, 2007
|align=center|1
|align=center|0:37
|Iowa, United States
|
|-
|Loss
|align=center| 10-2
| Kelly Kobold
| Submission (Punches)
| NFF - The Breakout
|March 10, 2007
|align=center|1
|align=center|3:26
|Minneapolis, Minnesota, United States
|
|-
|Win
|align=center| 10-1
| Brook Scott
| Submission (Punches)
| Royalty Fight Night 2
|February 10, 2007
|align=center|1
|align=center|0:30
|Emmetsburg, Iowa, United States
|
|-
|Win
|align=center| 9-1
| Heather Brade
| Submission (Punches)
| War Party Cage Fighting 4
|November 11, 2006
|align=center|1
|align=center|0:27
|Marshalltown, Iowa, United States
|
|-
|Win
|align=center| 8-1
| Lindsay Franks
| TKO (Punches)
| Extreme Challenge 73
|October 28, 2006
|align=center|1
|align=center|0:46
|Davenport, Iowa, United States
|
|-
|Win
|align=center| 7-1
| Samantha Smith
| Submission (Armbar)
| FF 3 - Helena Havoc
|September 9, 2006
|align=center|1
|align=center|0:56
|Helena, Montana, United States
|
|-
|Win
|align=center| 6-1
| Sonya Sargeant
| TKO (Punches)
| Greensparks - Full Contact Fighting 1
|August 19, 2006
|align=center|1
|align=center|N\A
|Clive, Iowa, United States
|
|-
|Win
|align=center| 5-1
| Samantha Smith
| Submission (Armbar)
| Extreme Challenge 69
|July 22, 2006
|align=center|1
|align=center|2:07
|Davenport, Iowa, United States
|
|-
|Win
|align=center| 4-1
| Amanda Marohl
| TKO (Punches)
| MCC 2 - Midwest Xplosion
|April 8, 2006
|align=center|1
|align=center|1:00
|Des Moines, Iowa, United States
|
|-
|Win
|align=center| 3-1
| Cindy Romero
| Submission (Slam)
| UCS - Battle at the Barn 10
|September 10, 2005
|align=center|1
|align=center|N\A
|Rochester, Minnesota, United States
|
|-
|Win
|align=center| 2-1
| Shelby Walker
| Submission (Rear-Naked Choke)
| HOOKnSHOOT - Evolution 2
|November 6, 2004
|align=center|1
|align=center|1:27
|Evansville, Indiana, United States
|
|-
|Loss
|align=center| 1-1
| Alisa Cantwell
| Submission (Punches)
| XFO 3
|October 2, 2004
|align=center|1
|align=center|1:17
|Lakemoor, Illinois, United States
|
|-
|Win
|align=center| 1-0
| Keri Scarr
| DQ (Illegal Soccer Kick and Knee)
| WEC 9
|January 16, 2004
|align=center|1
|align=center|N\A
|Lemoore, California, United States
|

See also
List of current Bellator fighters
List of female mixed martial artists

References

1981 births
Mixed martial artists from Hawaii
American female mixed martial artists
Featherweight mixed martial artists
Living people
People from Hawaii
People from Oceanside, California
21st-century American women